Several bird genera in multiple families contain species commonly known as wren-babblers, including:

Timaliidae 
 Spelaeornis

Pellorneidae 
 Napothera
 Rimator
 Ptilocichla
 Kenopia

Pnoepygidae 
 Pnoepyga

Elachuridae 
 Elachura

Animal common name disambiguation pages